Ronald Kyle Funches (born March 12, 1983) is an American actor, comedian, and writer. Born in California, Funches spent his early life in Chicago before relocating to Salem, Oregon, as a teenager. He began his comedy career in Portland, Oregon, at age 23. After moving to Los Angeles in 2012, he began appearing as a guest on several comedy series, including @midnight, Mulaney, and Kroll Show.

From 2014 to 2016, Funches starred as a regular on the NBC series Undateable, and in 2015, began performing as a voice actor on such series as BoJack Horseman, The Adventures of Puss in Boots, and Adventure Time. He subsequently performed the voice role of Cooper in the animated film Trolls (2016). He also had guest-starring roles on a number of television series, including Transparent (2016), Black-ish (2017), and reprised the role of Cooper in the Trolls spin-off series Trolls: The Beat Goes On! (2018).

Beginning in 2019, he began voicing the roles of King Shark in the DC Comics TV series Harley Quinn and Fox in the TBS/Adult Swim TV series Final Space. In 2020, Funches again reprised the role of Cooper in the sequel film Trolls World Tour. Starting in 2020, Funches voiced Ron on the Netflix series Hoops.

Early life
Ronald Kyle Funches was born March 12, 1983 in Carson, California, but spent his early life with his mother and sister in the Woodlawn neighborhood of Chicago, Illinois. Funches' mother was a social worker. When he was 13 years old, he moved to Salem, Oregon, to live with his father, who was employed there as a pipefitter.

He graduated from Douglas McKay High School in Salem, where he took English courses, and was inspired by writers such as Molière, J. D. Salinger, William Faulkner, and Erich Maria Remarque. After high school, Funches relocated to Portland, Oregon, where he worked a variety of jobs, including at a bank call center and as a clerk at a Grocery Outlet store.

Career

Funches began pursuing stand-up comedy at the age of 23 in Portland. After having a small role on an episode of Portlandia in 2011, he relocated to Los Angeles in 2012. Beginning in 2013, he was a regular panelist on the comedy series @midnight, had a recurring role in the comedy series Crash & Bernstein (2013),  and worked as a writer on The Eric Andre Show and Comedy Central's The Half Hour (2014). Also in 2014, Funches performed as a regular comic panelist on Chelsea Lately.

Beginning in 2014, Funches appeared in several episodes of Drunk History, and in 2015, performed numerous guest-starring voice roles on the animated series BoJack Horseman, The Adventures of Puss in Boots, and Adventure Time.

Funches subsequently starred as Shelly on the NBC comedy series Undateable from 2014 until the series' conclusion in 2016. Funches also had a supporting role in the 2015 comedy film Get Hard.

In 2016, he voiced the role of Cooper in the animated film Trolls, Also in 2016, Funches guest-starred on numerous series, such as Another Period, Take My Wife, and Transparent.

Beginning in 2019, he began voicing the role of King Shark in the DC Comics TV series Harley Quinn and the role of Fox in the TBS series Final Space. He played the recurring character "Funchy" in season 3 (2019) of the CBS sitcom Man with a Plan. Funches reprised his role of Cooper in the Trolls sequel, Trolls World Tour (2020). Funches also voiced Shag Rugg on the 2021 HBO Max television series Jellystone!.

On April 20, 2021, Funches became host of a new spinoff of the iconic Chopped cooking competition series.  The new show, streaming on Discovery+, called Chopped: 420 where the cheftestants have to make cannabis infused gourmet meals.

Influences
Funches has cited Lucille Ball, Dave Chappelle, and Mitch Hedberg as major influences on his comedy. Commenting on Ball, he said: "I Love Lucy was kind of my introduction to the world of comedy in general. And when you look at the history of Lucille Ball, and the work that she did for women in Hollywood, having her own production company, and also showing an interracial marriage on TV in the ’50s, to me, she’s just one of my biggest influences overall as a human being. That's what it means to be a professional and what it means to stand up for yourself even though interracial marriage has nothing to do with a career."

Personal life
Funches married his wife Christina in August 2020 and had a son together. In October 2022 they separated. He is open about his son being autistic in his comedy and welcomes fans sharing their stories with him.

Funches is an avid video gamer and wrestling fan, taking classes at a wrestling school for a few months and eventually making his in-ring debut at GCW in September 2021. In August 2022 he started his wrestling podcast One Fall with Ron Funches. 

He told Adam Carolla that he had once weighed 360 pounds. Funches said that over a few years he lost around 140 pounds.

Filmography

Film

Television

Other accomplishments
 DDT Pro-Wrestling
 Ironman Heavymetalweight Championship (1 time)

References

External links

 
 

1983 births
Living people
African-American male actors
African-American stand-up comedians
American male television actors
American male television writers
American stand-up comedians
American television writers
Comedians from California
Comedians from Illinois
Comedians from Oregon
Male actors from Chicago
Male actors from Portland, Oregon
Male actors from Salem, Oregon
Screenwriters from California
Screenwriters from Illinois
Screenwriters from Oregon
21st-century American comedians
21st-century American male actors
21st-century American screenwriters
21st-century American male writers
21st-century African-American writers
20th-century African-American people
African-American male writers
Ironman Heavymetalweight Champions
African-American history of Oregon